Navagraha Nayagi is a 1985 Tamil-language devotional film, directed by K. Shankar and produced by L. N. Nachiappan, L. N. Chidambaram and V. Rangasamy. The film stars Vijayakanth, Nalini, K. R. Vijaya and Srividya.

Cast

Vijayakanth
Nalini
K. R. Vijaya as Adhiparashakthi, Parvati
Srividya as Draupadi
V. S. Raghavan
Heran Ramaswamy as Shani
Major Sundarrajan as Guru Brihaspati
Cho Ramaswamy as Narathar
Anuradha
Sivachandran
Idichapuli Selvaraj
V. Gopalakrishnan 
Vennira Aadai Moorthy
Bindu Ghosh
Pandiyan
Suresh
Sasikala
Viji
Srikanth
Delhi Ganesh
Kamala Kamesh
Kirupanandha Variyar as the narrator
R. S. Manohar as Rahu

Soundtrack
Soundtrack was composed by M. S. Viswanathan.
"Thennikkal" - Sirkazhi Sivachidambaram, Vani Jairam,
"Kaatrukku Paattu" - Vani Jairam
"Ulagathukku" - B. S. Sasirekha, T. M. Soundararajan
"Navagraha Nayagi" - Sirkazhi Govindarajan
"Vaaranam Aayiram" - Vani Jairam
"Santhana Kudamondru" - Vani Jairam, Rajkumar Bharathi

Reception
Jayamanmadhan of Kalki felt director could have pruned the length to avoid the pace lagging.

References

External links
 
 

1985 films
Hindu devotional films
1980s Tamil-language films
Films scored by M. S. Viswanathan
Films directed by K. Shankar